Head of state is a term used in politics, law, and diplomacy.

Head of State may also refer to:
Head of State (2003 film), an American comedy film
Head of State (2016 film), an Armenian comedy film

See also 
Head of the State (album), a 2004 album by Cali Agents
Heads of State, a side project formed by members of the R&B group New Edition